Carlos Valentín Labrada Lleras (born December 9, 1985) is a former soccer player who played as a defender. Born in Mexico, he has represented the United States Virgin Islands national team internationally.

University soccer
Labrada represented the soccer team of the Richland College, the Thunderducks, in 2005 and 2006, scoring three goals in thirty-seven appearances.

Club career
Labrada was given the opportunity to move to the United States Virgin Islands to work at the Señor Frog's in Saint Thomas, having worked in their Mazatlán location. While on the island, he played for the UWS Upsetters.

He returned to Texas in the United States, where he played for NTX Rayados and FC Fort Worth.

International career
Labrada was born to a Cuban mother, who gained United States citizenship, making him eligible to represent the United States Virgin Islands, since he also holds American citizenship. He made his senior international debut on 29 March 2016 in a 2–1 defeat to Grenada in Caribbean Cup Qualifying.

He has also represented the United States Virgin Islands in beach soccer.

Career statistics

International

References

External links
 Carlos Labrada at CaribbeanFootballDatabase

1985 births
Living people
Sportspeople from Mazatlán
Footballers from Sinaloa
Mexican people of Cuban descent
Mexican footballers
United States Virgin Islands soccer players
United States Virgin Islands international soccer players
Association football defenders
Richland College Thunderducks men's soccer players